Discourella is a genus of mites in the order Mesostigmata, placed in its own family, Discourellidae.

Species

 Discourella anemoniae Hirschmann, 1972
 Discourella aokii Hiramatsu, 1979
 Discourella artificiosa Hiramatsu, 1979
 Discourella baloghi Hirschmann & Zirngiebl-Nicol, 1969
 Discourella baloghisimilis Wisniewski, 1984
 Discourella brasiliensis Hirschmann, 1972
 Discourella caputmedusae (Berlese & Leonardi, 1901)
 Discourella caputmedusaesimilis Hirschmann, 1972
 Discourella clivosa Hirschmann, 1972
 Discourella cordieri (Berlese, 1916)
 Discourella cosmogyna Berlese, 1910
 Discourella crucisimilis Hirschmann, 1972
 Discourella curtipila (J. F. Marais & G. C. Loots, 1979)
 Discourella deraiophoroides Hirschmann, 1972
 Discourella ditricha Hirschmann, 1972
 Discourella domotoi Hiramatsu, 1979
 Discourella dubiosa (Schweizer, 1961)
 Discourella eucoma (Willmann, 1951)
 Discourella eustructura Hirschmann, 1972
 Discourella falcata Hirschmann, 1972
 Discourella fissilis Hirschmann, 1972
 Discourella foraminosa Hiramatsu & Hirschmann, 1979
 Discourella formosa Hirschmann, 1972
 Discourella franzi Hirschmann & Zirngiebl-Nicol, 1969
 Discourella frondosa Hirschmann, 1972
 Discourella fumiakii Hiramatsu, 1980
 Discourella gatlinburgiana Wisniewski & Hirschmann, 1994
 Discourella gerlachl Hirschmann, 1972
 Discourella gracilis Hirschmann, 1973
 Discourella hirschmanni Hiramatsu, 1983
 Discourella hispanica Hirschmann & Zirngiebl-Nicol, 1969
 Discourella illustris Hiramatsu, 1983
 Discourella inflata (Marais & Loots, 1979)
 Discourella ishikawai Hiramatsu, 1979
 Discourella kaszabi Hirschmann, 1972
 Discourella komoroensis Hiramatsu, 1979
 Discourella koreae Hirschmann, 1981
 Discourella lindquisti Hiramatsu & Hirschmann, 1979
 Discourella longicarínata Hirschmann, 1972
 Discourella longipilosa Hiramatsu, 1980
 Discourella matsuurae Hiramatsu, 1983
 Discourella mexicana Hirschmann, 1979
 Discourella mihali (Masan, 1999)
 Discourella miyakawai Hiramatsu, 1979
 Discourella modesta (Leonardi, 1899)
 Discourella modestasimilis Hiramatsu & Hirschmann, 1979
 Discourella morikawai Hiramatsu, 1979
 Discourella omogoensis Hiramatsu, 1979
 Discourella onishii Hiramatsu, 1979
 Discourella orbiculata Hiramatsu, 1983
 Discourella pectoralis Hirschmann, 1972
 Discourella porosa Hirschmann, 1972
 Discourella porula Hirschmann, 1972
 Discourella pulcherrima Masan, 1999
 Discourella radnaensis (Wlllmann, 1941)
 Discourella reticulata Hirschmann, 1972
 Discourella rotunda Hirschmann, 1972
 Discourella rotundasimilis Hirschmann, 1973
 Discourella rotundiformis Hirschmann, 1973
 Discourella ruehmi Hirschmann, 1972
 Discourella salignifolia Hirschmann, 1972
 Discourella sellnicki Hirschmann & Zirngiebl-Nicol, 1969
 Discourella silvestrisa Hiramatsu, 1977
 Discourella simonbolivari Hutu, 1987
 Discourella solaris Hirschmann, 1972
 Discourella spumans Hirschmann, 1972
 Discourella stammeri Hirschmann & Zirngiebl-Nicol, 1969
 Discourella torpida Hiramatsu & Hirschmann, 1979
 Discourella tuberculata Hirschmann, 1973
 Discourella tuberosa Hirschmann, 1972
 Discourella venezuelensis Hutu, 1987
 Discourella woelkei Hirschmann, 1975

References

Mesostigmata